Pillus  is a type of pasta found in Sardinia, particularly around Oristano.  A noodle-like pasta, it is made in thin ribbon strips.  A feature of this pasta is that it is kneaded for a long time.  It is cooked in beef (or sometimes sheep) broth and served with pecorino cheese.  In Busachi the pasta is flavoured with toasted saffron and ground to a powder.

Lisanzedas is a variant of pillus (and sometimes named as such) that is oven-baked in layers like lasagne.  The shape of the pasta is large (7 to 8 inches) diameter disks rather than ribbons.  It is the meat stew filling and the pecorino cheese that are the common factors rather than the shape of the pasta.  A variant of lisanzedas found around Cagliari is flavoured with saffron.  Another variant of this sort from Giba is flavoured with fennel.

References

External links 
 Pillus pasta with goat meat, image of dish from Zinnibiri restaurant, Sardinia

Cuisine of Sardinia
Types of pasta